Facundo Peraza Fontana (born July 27, 1992) is an Uruguayan footballer who plays for Peruvian club UTC.

Club career
Born in Canelones, Uruguay, he debuted for Boston River in a 1–1 draw against Huracán de Paso de la Arena for the 2012–13 Uruguayan Segunda División season.

Cobreloa
On June 7, 2015 he was presented at Primera B de Chile (second-tier) side Cobreloa algonside other 11 players: the four Argentinian players Nahuel Pansardi, Walter Gómez, Jorge De Olivera and Jorge Piris and the seven Chilean players Bryan Danesi, Paulo Olivares, Enzo Guerrero, José Barrera, Manuel Simpertegui, Carlos Santibáñez, Boris Sandoval.

Notes

References

External links
 
 

1992 births
Living people
People from Canelones Department
Uruguayan footballers
Uruguayan expatriate footballers
Association football forwards
Boston River players
Atenas de San Carlos players
S.D. Aucas footballers
Cobreloa footballers
C.A. Cerro players
Club Atlético River Plate (Montevideo) players
Academia Puerto Cabello players
C.A. Progreso players
C.A. Rentistas players
Universidad Técnica de Cajamarca footballers
Uruguayan Primera División players
Uruguayan Segunda División players
Primera B de Chile players
Uruguayan expatriate sportspeople in Chile
Uruguayan expatriate sportspeople in Ecuador
Uruguayan expatriate sportspeople in Venezuela
Uruguayan expatriate sportspeople in Peru
Expatriate footballers in Chile
Expatriate footballers in Ecuador
Expatriate footballers in Venezuela
Expatriate footballers in Peru